Salvatore Ninfo (1883-1960) was a union organizer and officer for the International Ladies' Garment Workers' Union (ILGWU).

Biography

Born in Sicily, Ninfo immigrated to the United States in 1899. For the next decade, Ninfo worked to organize Italian workers and lead in the garment industry's major early strikes. Except for a period (1903-1906) when he worked to organize Italian craft workers in New York, Philadelphia, and Boston for the American Federation of Labor (AFL), Ninfo worked with the ILGWU.

In 1902, Ninfo joined Local 9, the New York Cloak Finishers' and Tailors' Union. In 1906, when he returned from organizing for the AFL, he served as a member of the executive board of Local 9, and in 1908, he was both a delegate to the Cloak Joint Board and a general organizer for the ILGWU. Ninfo was deeply involved in the dressmakers' strike (1909) and the cloakmakers' strike (1910), also known as the "Uprising of the 20,000" and "The Great Revolt," and after the Protocol of Peace, he served as a business agent for the New York Cloak Joint Board and manager of Local 48.

Ninfo was elected vice president (1916) and then for a brief period of about four months, between Benjamin Schlesinger's resignation and Morris Sigman's election, he served as Acting President of the ILGWU (1923). After Sigman's election, Ninfo became first vice president (1923-1934) and later (1936), manager of Local 145 in Passaic, New Jersey.

Ninfo left the ILGWU when he was elected to the New York City Council on the American Labor Party ticket in 1937. He served on the city council until 1943.

In 1939, just days after the outbreak of World War II, Ninfo's 29-year-old son Ralph was convicted of "inciting to a breach of the peace" by making sidewalk speeches calling for all American Jews to be killed. The elder Ninfo said he hoped his son would be "put in jail for the rest of his life," adding that he had washed his hands of his son. Ralph Ninfo said he had joined the Coughlinite Christian Citizens Committee.

References

Sources
Biography of Salvatore Ninfo

External links
 Guide to the ILGWU Records. 5780. Kheel Center for Labor-Management Documentation and Archives, Martin P. Catherwood Library, Cornell University. 

American trade union leaders
International Ladies Garment Workers Union leaders
1883 births
1960 deaths
New York City Council members
American Labor Party politicians
Italian emigrants to the United States
20th-century American politicians
American people of Italian descent